A super-maximum security (supermax) or administrative maximum (ADX) prison is a "control-unit" prison, or a unit within prisons, which represents the most secure level of custody in the prison systems of certain countries.

The objective is to provide long-term, segregated housing for inmates classified as the highest security risks in the prison system and those who pose an extremely serious threat to both national and global security.

Characteristics and practices 

According to the National Institute of Corrections, an agency of the United States government, "a supermax is a stand-alone unit or part of another facility and is designated for violent or disruptive incarcerated individuals. It typically involves up to 23-hour-per-day, single-cell confinement for an indefinite period of time. Those incarcerated in supermax housing have minimal contact with staff and other inmates," a definition confirmed by a majority of prison wardens.

In 2001, academics Leena Kurki and Norval Morris wrote that there was no universal, agreed upon definition for "supermax" and that prisons are classified inconsistently. They identified four general features of supermax prisons:

 Long-term: once transferred to a supermax prison, incarcerated individuals tend to stay there for several years or indefinitely.
 Powerful administration: supermax administrators and correctional officers have ample authority to punish and manage incarcerated individuals, without outside review or prisoner grievance systems.
 Solitary confinement: supermax prisons rely heavily on intensive (and long-term) solitary confinement, which is used to isolate and punish prisoners as well as to protect them from themselves and each other. Communication with outsiders is minimal to none.
 Very limited activities: few opportunities are provided for recreation, education, substance abuse programs, or other activities generally considered healthy and rehabilitative at other prisons.

Those who are in a supermax prison are placed not as a punishment of their crimes but by their previous history when incarcerated or based on reliable evidence of an impending disruption, such as a gang leader or the leader of a radical movement. These decisions are made as administrative protection measures and the prisoners in a supermax are deemed by correctional workers as a threat to the safety and security of the institution itself.

The amount of programming for those in prison varies from jurisdiction to jurisdiction. Certain jurisdictions provide entertainment for their incarcerated population in the form of television, educational and self-help programs. Others provide instructors who speak through the cell door to individuals who are incarcerated. Some jurisdictions provide no programming to its incarcerated population. In a supermax, incarcerated people are generally allowed out of their cells for only one hour a day (one-and-a-half hours in California state prisons). Exercise is done in indoor spaces or small, secure, outdoor spaces, usually alone or in a pair and always watched by correctional officers. Group exercise is offered only to those who are in transition programs.

Prisoners receive their meals through ports in the doors of their cells.

People in these prisons are under constant surveillance, usually with closed-circuit television cameras. Cell doors are usually opaque, while the cells may be windowless. Furnishings are plain, with poured concrete or metal furniture. Cell walls, and sometimes plumbing, may be soundproofed to prevent communication between people.

Supermax and Security Housing Unit (SHU) prisons are controversial. One criticism is that the living conditions in such facilities violate the United States Constitution, specifically, the Eighth Amendment's proscription against "cruel and unusual" punishments. A 2011 New York Bar association comprehensive study suggested that supermax prisons constitute "torture under international law" and "cruel and unusual punishment under the U.S. Constitution". In 2012, a federal class action suit against the Federal Bureau of Prisons and officials who run ADX Florence SHU (Bacote v. Federal Bureau of Prisons, Civil Action 1:12-cv-01570) alleged chronic abuse, failure to properly diagnose prisoners, and neglect of prisoners who are seriously mentally ill.

History

Australia 
An early form of supermax-style prison unit appeared in Australia in 1975, when "Katingal" was built inside the Long Bay Correctional Centre in Sydney. Dubbed the "electronic zoo" by inmates, Katingal was a super-maximum security prison block with 40 prison cells having electronically operated doors, surveillance cameras, and no windows. It was closed down two years later over human rights concerns. Since then, some maximum-security prisons have gone to full lockdown as well, while others have been built and dedicated to the supermax standard. In September 2001, the Australian state of New South Wales opened a facility in the Goulburn Correctional Centre to the supermax standard. While its condition is an improvement over that of Katingal of the 1970s, this new facility is nonetheless designed on the same principle of sensory deprivation. It has been set up for 'AA' prisoners who have been deemed a risk to public safety and the instruments of government and civil order or are believed to be beyond rehabilitation. Corrections Victoria in the state of Victoria also operates the Acacia and Melaleuca  units at Barwon Prison which serve to hold the prisoners requiring the highest security in that state including Melbourne Gangland figures such as Tony Mokbel, and Carl Williams, who was murdered in the Acacia unit in 2010.

Brazil 
In 1985, the state government of São Paulo created an annex to a psychiatric penitentiary hospital meant to house the most violent inmates of the region and established the Penitentiary of Rehabilitation Center of Taubaté, also known as Piranhão. Previously, high-risk inmates were housed at a prison on Anchieta Island; however, that closed down after a bloody massacre. At Taubaté, inmates spent 23 hours of a day in solitary confinement and spent 30 minutes a day with a small group of seven to ten inmates. Ill-treatment of inmates occurred on a daily basis, causing major psychological impairment.

Throughout the 1990s, and the early-2000s, Brazil faced major challenges with gang structures within its prisons. The gang Primeiro Comando da Capital (PCC) gained notoriety in the prison system and had new members joining within the prisons. Riots were a common occurrence and the gang culture became uncontrollable, leading authorities to pass the controversial Regime Disciplinar Diferenciado (RDD), a culture founded from disciplinary punishment.

Germany 
Stammheim Prison, in Stuttgart, Germany, opened as a supermax-style prison in 1964, with an additional wing built in 1975 to house members of the far-left militant Red Army Faction. At the time, it was considered one of the most secure prisons in the world.

United Kingdom 
His Majesty's Prison Service in England and Wales has had a long history in controlling prisoners that are high-risk. Prisoners are categorized into four main classifications (A, B, C, D) with A being "highly dangerous" with a high risk of escaping to category D in which inmates "can be reasonably trusted in open conditions."

The British government formed the Control Review Committee in 1984 to allow for regulating long-term disruptive prisoners. The committee proposed special units (called CRC units) which were formally introduced in 1989 to control for highly-disruptive prisoners to be successfully reintegrated. Yet a series of escapes, riots, and investigations by authorities saw the units come to a close in 1998. They were replaced by Close Supervision Centres (CSC). It was reported to hold 60 of the most dangerous men in the UK in 2015.

United States 

The United States Penitentiary Alcatraz Island, opened in 1934, has been considered a prototype and early standard for a supermax prison. A push for supermax prisons began in 1983, after two correctional officers, Merle Clutts and Robert Hoffman, were stabbed to death by inmates at Federal Penitentiary in Marion, Illinois. Norman Carlson, the director of the Federal Bureau of Prisons, argued for a new type of prison to isolate uncontrollable inmates who "show absolutely no concern for human life". USP Marion became the first "supermax" prison where inmates were isolated for 23 hours in their cells. By 1999, the United States contained at least 57 supermax facilities, spread across 30–34 states.

In recent years a number of U.S. states have downgraded their supermax prisons,  as has been done with Wallens Ridge State Prison, a former supermax prison in Big Stone Gap, Virginia. Other supermax prisons that have gained notoriety for their harsh conditions and attendant litigation by inmates and advocates are the former Boscobel (in Wisconsin), now named the Wisconsin Secure Program Facility, Red Onion State Prison (in western Virginia, the twin to Wallens Ridge State Prison), Tamms (in Illinois), and the Ohio State Penitentiary. Placement policies at the Ohio facility were the subject of a U.S. Supreme Court case (Wilkinson v. Austin) in 2005 where the Court decided that there had to be some, but only very limited, due process involved in supermax placement.

There is only one supermax prison remaining in the U.S. federal prison system, ADX Florence in Florence, Colorado.  It houses numerous inmates who have a history of violent behavior in other prisons, with the goal of moving them from solitary confinement (up to 23 hours a day) to a less restrictive prison within three years.

However, it is best known for housing several inmates who have been deemed either too dangerous, too high-profile or too great a national security risk for even a maximum-security prison. They include several prisoners convicted of domestic and international terrorism, such as Timothy McVeigh and Terry Nichols, who perpetrated the Oklahoma City Bombing; Richard Reid and Umar Farouk Abdulmutallab, who separately attempted to detonate explosives on a commercial airplane flight; and Dzhokhar Tsarnaev, convicted for the 2013 Boston Marathon bombing. Other notable inmates include Robert Hanssen, convicted of espionage for the Soviet Union and Joaquin "El Chapo" Guzman, the head of the Mexican Sinaloa Cartel and the world's most powerful drug lord, convicted in 2019.

However, many states now have created supermax prisons, either as stand-alone facilities or as secure units within lower-security prisons. State supermax prisons include Pelican Bay in California and Tamms in Illinois. In 2006, USP Marion, the original model for the modern supermax prison, was downgraded to a medium-security prison. The California State Prison, Corcoran (COR) is a hybrid model, incorporating a supermax partition, housing or having housed high-security prisoners such as Charles Manson.

Cost-benefit analysis of supermax prisons 
There is no set definition of a supermax prison; however, the United States Department of Justice and the National Institute of Corrections do agree on their purpose: "these units have basically the same function: to provide long-term, segregated housing for inmates classified as the highest security risks in a state’s prison system."

Costs of operating a supermax prison 
Building a supermax prison, or even retrofitting an existing prison, is expensive. Construction of ADX Florence cost $60 million when it opened in 1994.

Compared to a maximum security facility, supermax prisons cost about three times more on average. The 1999 average annual cost for inmates at Colorado State Penitentiary, a supermax facility, was $32,383, compared with the annual inmate cost of $18,549 at the Colorado Correctional Center, a maximum-security prison (less than twice as expensive). The increased cost is due to the technology needed to further maintain a supermax: high-security doors, fortified walls, and sophisticated electronic systems, and because more people must be hired to maintain the buildings and facilities.

Prisons with supermax facilities

North America

Canada 
 Special Handling Unit (Sainte-Anne-des-Plaines, Quebec) – Houses Canada's most dangerous and violent inmates

Mexico 
 Penal del Altiplano – Almoloya de Juarez, State of Mexico. Full Supermax and the only facility of this kind in Mexico.

United States 

 Most of these facilities only contain supermax wings or sections, with other parts of the facility under lesser security measures.

 Alabama
 Holman Correctional Facility – Atmore, Alabama
 Arizona
 ASPC-Eyman, SMU I – Florence, Arizona
 ASPC-Eyman, Browning Unit (Previously SMU II) – Florence, Arizona
 United States Penitentiary – Tucson, Arizona
 Arkansas
 Varner Supermax – Lincoln County, Arkansas
 California
 United States Penitentiary – Atwater, California
 Pelican Bay State Prison – Crescent City, California
 United States Penitentiary, Alcatraz Island – San Francisco, California (Closed 21 March 1963)
 California Correctional Institution – Tehachapi, California
 High Desert State Prison – Susanville, California
 Richard J. Donovan Correctional Facility – San Ysidro, California
 Colorado
 Centennial Correctional Facility – Cañon City, Colorado
 Colorado State Penitentiary – Cañon City, Colorado
 United States Penitentiary, Administrative Maximum Facility (USP Florence ADMAX) – Florence, Colorado
 Connecticut
 Northern Correctional Institution – Somers, Connecticut
 Florida
 United States Penitentiary – Coleman, Florida
 Florida State Prison – Raiford, Florida
 Georgia
 United States Penitentiary – Atlanta, Georgia
 Idaho
 Idaho Maximum Security Institution – Boise, Idaho
 Illinois
 Tamms Correctional Center – Tamms, Illinois (Closed January 2013)
 Menard Correctional Center – Chester, Illinois
 United States Penitentiary – Thomson, Illinois
 Indiana
 Wabash Valley Correctional Facility, SHU – Carlisle, Indiana
 Westville Correctional Facility, WCU – Westville, Indiana
 United States Penitentiary – Terre Haute, Indiana
 Kansas
 United States Disciplinary Barracks – Fort Leavenworth, Kansas (military prison)
 United States Penitentiary – Leavenworth, Kansas (being downgraded to medium security)
 Kentucky
 Kentucky State Penitentiary – Eddyville, Kentucky (the only prison in Kentucky housing supermax units)
 Louisiana
 Louisiana State Penitentiary – West Feliciana Parish, Louisiana
 United States Penitentiary – Pollock, Louisiana
 Maine
 Maine State Prison – Warren, Maine 
 Maryland
 Chesapeake Detention Facility – Baltimore, Maryland
 North Branch Correctional Institution – Cumberland, Maryland (final housing unit began operation in summer of 2008)
 Massachusetts
 Souza-Baranowski Correctional Center – Lancaster, Massachusetts
 Massachusetts Correctional Institution – Cedar Junction – Walpole, Massachusetts
 Minnesota
 Minnesota Correctional Facility Oak Park Heights – Oak Park Heights, Minnesota (Although Oak Park Heights is classified as a Supermax, the majority of inmates are not housed in solitary confinement)
 Mississippi
 Mississippi State Penitentiary – Sunflower County, Mississippi (Unit 32)
 Missouri
 Jefferson City Correctional Center – Jefferson City, Missouri
 Potosi Correctional Center – Mineral Point, Missouri
 Southeast Correctional Center – Charleston, Missouri 
 South Central Correctional Center – Licking, Missouri 
 Chillicothe Correctional Center – Chillicothe, Missouri
 New Hampshire
 New Hampshire State Prison for Men – Concord, New Hampshire
 New Jersey
 New Jersey State Prison – Trenton, New Jersey
 East Jersey State Prison – Woodbridge, New Jersey
 Northern State Prison – Newark, New Jersey
 Essex County Correctional Facility – Newark, New Jersey
 New Mexico
 Penitentiary of New Mexico – unincorporated Santa Fe County, New Mexico – Uses the Bureau Classification System – Level 6 being Supermax
 New York
 Attica Correctional Facility – Attica, New York
 Five Points Correctional Facility – Romulus, New York
 Sing Sing Correctional Facility – Ossining, New York
 Southport Correctional Facility – (disciplinary supermax prison with only solitary confinement), Pine City, New York
 Upstate Correctional Facility – Malone, New York
 North Carolina
 Polk Correctional Institution – Butner, North Carolina
 Ohio
 Ohio State Penitentiary – Youngstown, Ohio
 Oklahoma
 Oklahoma State Penitentiary – McAlester, Oklahoma
 Oregon
 Oregon State Penitentiary  – Salem, Oregon
 Pennsylvania
 United States Penitentiary – Allenwood, Pennsylvania
 United States Penitentiary – Lewisburg, Pennsylvania
 State Correctional Institution – Greene – Waynesburg, Pennsylvania
 State Correctional Institution – Phoenix – Skippack Township, Pennsylvania
 South Carolina
 Kirkland Correctional Institution – Columbia, South Carolina
 Tennessee
 Riverbend Maximum Security Institution – Nashville, Tennessee
 Texas
United States Penitentiary – Jefferson County, Texas
 Estelle High Security Unit – W.J. Estelle Unit – Walker County, Texas
 Allan B. Polunsky Unit (formerly Terrell Unit) – West Livingston, Texas<ref>Ward, Mike. "Death row inmates free guard, meet with activists." Austin American-Statesman. 23 February 2000. "A prison guard held hostage by two execution-bound killers inside Texas'``super maxdeath row[...]" and "Tuesday deep inside the maximum-security Terrell Unit just outside[...]"</ref>
Gib Lewis Unit High Security Expansion Cellblock "super seg" — Woodville, Texas
 Utah
 Utah State Correctional Facility – Salt Lake City, Utah
 Virginia
 Wallens Ridge State Prison – Big Stone Gap, Virginia
 Red Onion State Prison – Wise County, Virginia
 United States Penitentiary, Lee - Jonesville, Virginia - Lee County
 Washington
 Washington State Penitentiary – Walla Walla, Washington
 West Virginia
 Mt. Olive Correctional Complex – Fayette County, West Virginia
 Wisconsin
 Wisconsin Secure Program Facility – Boscobel, Wisconsin

 South America 

 Brazil 

In Brazil, the "regime disciplinar diferenciado" (differentiated disciplinary regime), known by the acronym RDD, and strongly based on the Supermax standard, was created primarily to handle inmates who are considered capable of continuing to run their crime syndicate or to order criminal actions from within the prison system, when confined in normal maximum security prisons that allow contact with other inmates. Since its inception, the following prisons were prepared for the housing of RDD inmates:

 Presidente Bernardes Provisional Readaptation Center (Presidente Bernardes, São Paulo, Brazil) – inspired by the supermax standards, although prisoners can only stay there for a maximum of 2 years. Is a part of the prison system of the Brazilian State of São Paulo.
 Catanduvas Federal Penitentiary (Catanduvas, Paraná, Brazil) – also based on the supermax standards. It is the first federal prison in Brazil, designed to receive prisoners deemed too dangerous to be kept in the states' prison systems (in Brazil, ordinarily, both convicts sentenced by States' courts or by the Federal Judiciary fulfill their prison terms in state-run prisons; the Federal Prison System was created to handle only the most dangerous prisoners in Brazil, such as major drug lords, convicted either by the Federal Judiciary or by the judiciary of a state).
 Campo Grande Federal Penitentiary (Campo Grande, Mato Grosso do Sul, Brazil) – the second of two Brazilian Federal prisons based on the supermax specifications.

 Colombia 

 Penitenciaría de Cómbita (Colombia) – follows supermax specifications, hosts terrorists and drug lords.
 Establecimiento Penitenciario de Alta y Mediana Seguridad de Girón EPAMSGIRON.

 Europe 

Leopoldov Prison – (Leopoldov, Slovakia) a 17th-century fortress built against Ottoman Turks that was converted into a high-security prison
Portlaoise Prison (Portlaoise, Ireland) – One of the most secure prisons in Europe, protected full time by members of the Irish Defence Forces. Held many convicted IRA prisoners.
 Nieuw Vosseveld – Dutch High Security prison in Vught
 Stammheim Prison – German High Security Prison, partly purpose-built to keep Red Army Faction terrorists in the 1970s and 1980s.
 Politigårdens Fængsel – (Copenhagen – Denmark) There are 25 maximum security cells located in the prison of the central police station of Copenhagen
 The State Prison of East Jutland – (Horsens – Denmark) – High Security Prison. Holds many of Denmark's most dangerous criminals.
 Penal colony № 6 Federal Penitentiary Service – Sol-Iletsk – Russia – correctional facility in Sol-Iletsk, Orenburg Oblast, Russia.
 Kumla Prison, Hall Prison, and Saltvik Prison – Sweden – All three prisons have a similar security unit called Fenix, which can house 24 inmates.

 Italy

 Sassari District Prison "Giovanni Bacchiddu" at Bancali, Sardinia. The only Italian prison specially designed and built as a Supermax, housing about 90 super-high security criminals all subject to the provisions of the Article 41-bis prison regime, detained in self-contained sections, each with 4 cells, a small courtyard and a video-conference room where they can be interrogated and undergo trials without leaving the prison. This specially-designed supermax has been built to replace the old maximum-security prison of the Asinara island, the so-called "Italian Alcatraz", that was closed in 2002.
 Another 10 Italian prisons have Supermax sections housing 41-bis inmates, besides the ordinary detention facilities, as follows:
 L'Aquila District Prison – The largest Supermax section in Italy, housing over 150 inmates. Contains a section for female prisoners.
 Cuneo District Prison – About 90 inmates.
 Novara District Prison – About 90 inmates.
 Parma District Prison – About 70 inmates.
 Rebibbia District Prison, Rome – About 60 inmates - also contains a section for female prisoners.
 Secondigliano District Prison "Pasquale Mandato", Naples – About 24 inmates.
 Spoleto Detention Structure – About 80 inmates.
 Terni District Prison – About 24 inmates.
 Tolmezzo District Prison – About 24 inmates.
 Viterbo District Prison "Mammagialla" – About 50 inmates.
 Another Supermax section was closed down during 2018.
 Ascoli Piceno District Prison at Marino del Tronto.

 United Kingdom 
 Belmarsh – London, England, United Kingdom –  many of the terrorists of the 2006 transatlantic aircraft plot are imprisoned there.
 Frankland – Durham, England, United Kingdom – High Security Prison with a special unit for prisoners suffering from Dangerous and Severe Personality Disorders.
 Full Sutton – York, England, United Kingdom – High Security Prison.
 Long Lartin – Worcestershire, England, United Kingdom – High Security Prison.
 Maghaberry – Lisburn, Northern Ireland, United Kingdom – High Security Prison
 Manchester – Strangeways, Manchester, England, United Kingdom – High Security Prison with a special unit for prisoners suffering from Dangerous and Severe Personality Disorders.
 Prison Shotts – Shotts, Scotland, United Kingdom – High Security Prison. Holds some of the UK's most dangerous and violent criminals.
 Whitemoor – March, Cambridgeshire, England, United Kingdom – houses up to 500 of the most dangerous criminals in the UK. It has a unit known as the 'Close Supervision Centre' which is referred to as a "Prison inside a Prison". It has a special unit for prisoners with Dangerous and Severe Personality Disorders.
 Wakefield – Wakefield, England, United Kingdom – High Security Prison with a 'Close Supervision Centre'. It is nicknamed "The Monster Mansion" due to the many high-profile convicted murderers incarcerated there.
 Woodhill – Milton Keynes, England, United Kingdom – High Security Prison with a specialist 'Close Supervision Centre'.

 Africa 

 C Max (Pretoria, South Africa) – for violent and disruptive prisoners.
 Scorpion Prison (Cairo, Egypt) – Supermax prison located inside the Tora Prison complex.

 Asia 

 Gyeongbuk Northern the Second Correctional Center (Prison), Cheongsong, Gyeongsangbuk-do, South Korea
 KEMTA, Taiping, Perak Malaysia
 Al Hayer Prison (Riyadh, Saudi Arabia)
 Bilibid Prison (Manila, Philippines) – Large maximum security prison with around 17,000–20,000 convicted prisoners.
 Nusa Kambangan Correctional Facility, Central Java, Indonesia – Supermax prison built during the Dutch era, now under the jurisdiction of Ministry of Law and Human Rights
 Black Dolphin – Russian maximum-security prison for convicts sentenced to life imprisonment.
 White Swan – Russian maximum-security prison for convicts sentenced to life imprisonment.
 Al-Muwaqqar II Correctional and Rehabilitation Center is a super-maximum security prison with 240 cells in Jordan, see also Correction centers in Jordan. It is designed to hold incorrigibly violent inmates in separate isolation cells.
 Khao Bin Central Prison, Ratchaburi, Thailand – Supermax facility being opened in the first half of 2014.

 Australia 

 Goulburn Correctional CentreFull Supermax prison, the highest level of security in Australia75-bed centre, (Goulburn, New South Wales).
 Casuarina PrisonSpecial Handling Unit (SHU) (Perth, Western Australia)
 Risdon Prison Complex8 cell Tamar Unit (Risdon Vale, Tasmania)
 His Majesty's Prison BarwonBarwon Supermax (Lara, Victoria)
 Port Phillip Prison Charlotte unit (Truganina, Victoria)
 Brisbane Correctional Centre18-cell Maximum Security Unit (Brisbane, Queensland)
 Alexander Maconochie Centre12-cell Supermax Section (Hume, Australian Capital Territory)
 Yatala Labour PrisonG Division (Northfield, South Australia)
 Alice Springs Correctional Centre12-cell Supermax Unit (Alice Springs, Northern Territory)

 See also 

 List of prisons
 Penology
 Panopticon
 Solitary confinement
 Incarceration in the United States (security levels)
 Article 41-bis prison regime the Italian high security treatment for Mafiosi and terrorists
 Prisoner security categories in the United Kingdom
 F-type Prisons (Turkey)
 Black Dolphin Prison

Notes

 References 

 External links 
 California's Security Housing Units
 Recording Carceral Landscapes: Security Housing Unit
 Supermax lockup for spammer Rizler
 The Resistable (sic) Rise and Predictable Fall of the U.S. Supermax by Stephen F. Eisenman, Monthly Review'', November 2009

 
Law enforcement terminology